Greece competed at the 2014 Winter Olympics in Sochi, Russia, from 7 to 23 February 2014. The Greek team consisted of seven athletes in four sports. As the founding nation of the Olympic games and in keeping with tradition, Greece entered first during the opening ceremony.

Alpine skiing 

According to the final quota allocation released on 20 January 2014, Greece has three athletes in qualification position.

Cross-country skiing 

According to the final quota allocation released on 20 January 2014, Greece had two athletes in qualification position.

Sprint

Skeleton 

Greece had one athlete in qualification position.

Ski jumping 

Greece received a reallocation quota spot in men's ski jumping.

References

External links 
 
 

Nations at the 2014 Winter Olympics
2014
2014 in Greek sport